Miss World 1992, the 42nd edition of the Miss World pageant, was held on 12 December 1992 at the Sun City Entertainment Center in Sun City, South Africa. The winner was Julia Kourotchkina from Russia. She was crowned by Miss World 1991, Ninibeth Leal of Venezuela.

Results

Placements

Continental Queens of Beauty

Contestants

Judges

 Eric Morley † 
 Anthony Delon
 Jarvis Astaire † 
 Suzanne de Passe
 Kim Alexis
 Mbongeni Ngema
 Gary Player
 Ivana Trump † 
 Yvonne Chaka Chaka
 Sidney Sheldon † 
 Alan Whicker † 
 Joan Collins

Notes

Debuts

Returns

Last competed in 1974:
 
Last competed in 1975:
 
Last competed in 1989:
 
 
Last competed in 1990:

Replacements
  – Marina Santos Benipayo was a last minute replacement for original representative Marilen Espino who had to withdraw due to an illness just days before her departure.

Withdrawals

  – Melanie Smith - Lack of Sponsorship. Went to Miss Universe 1993 instead.
  – No contest.
  – Yanina Elizabeth Fajardo - Lack of Sponsorship. Went to Miss Asia Pacific Quest 1992 instead.
  – No contest.
  – Ingrid Yrivarren - Due visa problems and for some disagreements under her contract with Miss Peru Organization.
  – No contest due to the Yugoslav Wars and sanctions placed to this country until 1996.

References

External links
 Pageantopolis – Miss World 1992

Miss World
1992 in South Africa
1992 beauty pageants
Beauty pageants in South Africa
December 1992 events in Africa